E. montana may refer to:

Ena montana, an air-breathing land snail
Epichnopterix montana, a moth of the family Psychidae
Erethistoides montana, a South Asian river catfish
Eucomis montana, a plant species found in Southern Africa
Eucommia montana, an extinct species of flowering plant in the family Eucommiaceae
Eupithecia montana, a moth in the family Geometridae

See also 
 Montana (disambiguation)